The 2011 Rugby World Cup was the seventh Rugby World Cup, a quadrennial international rugby union competition inaugurated in 1987. The International Rugby Board (IRB) selected New Zealand as the host country in preference to Japan and South Africa at a meeting in Dublin on 17 November 2005. The tournament was won by New Zealand, who defeated France 8–7 in the final. The defending champions, South Africa, were eliminated by Australia 11–9 in the quarter-finals. The result marked the third time that the tournament was won by the country that hosted the event (following New Zealand in 1987 and South Africa in 1995).

It was the largest sporting event ever held in New Zealand, eclipsing the 1987 Rugby World Cup, 1990 Commonwealth Games, 1992 Cricket World Cup and the 2003 America's Cup. Overseas visitors to New Zealand for the event totalled 133,000, more than the 95,000 that the organisers expected. However, there was a drop in non-event visitors, meaning the net increase in visitors over the previous year was less than 80,000.

The games ran over six weeks, commencing on 9 September 2011 with the opening ceremony showcasing New Zealand's history and diverse cultures. The final was played at Eden Park in Auckland on 23 October 2011, a date chosen because it fell on a long weekend of New Zealand's Labour Day holiday.

After speculation that the number of participating teams would be reduced to 16, the IRB announced on 30 November 2007 that the 2011 tournament would again feature 20 teams. Twelve teams qualified as a result of finishing in the top three in each pool in the 2007 tournament. The remaining eight berths were determined by regional qualifying tournaments. Of the 20 countries that competed in the previous World Cup in 2007, there was only one change – Russia replaced Portugal.

Host selection
Three nations bid to host the 2011 Rugby World Cup – New Zealand, Japan, and South Africa.

New Zealand had co-hosted the first Rugby World Cup with Australia in 1987, and had been set to co-host the 2003 World Cup with Australia before a disagreement over ground signage rights resulted in New Zealand being dropped and Australia became the sole host. The 2011 New Zealand bid contained plans to enlarge the size of Eden Park and other stadiums to help increase the commercial viability of the bid.

Japan was bidding to become the first Asian nation to host the first Rugby World Cup. Japan had the necessary infrastructure already in place, by virtue of its co-hosting the 2002 FIFA World Cup.

South Africa had hosted the tournament in 1995. The 2011 South African bid, led by former national captain Francois Pienaar, had strong support from their national government. South Africa had also won the right to host the 2010 FIFA World Cup.

The IRB Council meeting in Dublin on 17 November 2005 announced that New Zealand had been selected after IRB inspections of each applicant host nation during June and July 2005.

Preparations

Costs and benefits
The event was expected to cost about NZ$310 million to run and to generate NZ$280 million in ticket sales. In Auckland, the city where many of the most important games took place, the costs to the local ratepayers alone was estimated at $102 million.

Ticket sales exceeding NZ$285 million, accommodation-related spending of another NZ$260 million, and NZ$236 million spent on food and drink was expected to provide a significant fiscal stimulus, of nearly 1.4% of the quarterly GDP.

Concerns
In the years between winning the bid and the staging of the event, New Zealand news media and social agencies cast aspersions on the nation's readiness and appropriate use of national funds for sports infrastructure, as has happened with most large, international, quadrennial, multi-location sporting events of recent decades such as the 2012 Olympics, 2010 FIFA World Cup and the 2010 Commonwealth Games. Concerns were raised about the process of upgrading Eden Park to expand the capacity to the 60,000 required by the IRB. In late 2008 Rugby World Cup Minister Murray McCully said the remaining consent process might need to be overridden by legislation for the work to be completed on time.

A July 2009 report by the Auckland Regional Transport Authority, released under the Official Information Act, warned of lack of readiness and complacency, despite the fact that "the levels of patron movement and operational standard [needed for the RWC] are in reality significantly above what is currently delivered." The report was dismissed by Michael Barnett, the Auckland Chamber of Commerce CEO and planning co-coordinator for RWC events in Auckland, who characterised it as a case of "a Wellington media organisation us[ing] an outdated report".

The nation's largest hospitality workers' union, Unite, which represents 25% of hotel, restaurant and casino workers in New Zealand, demanded that workers share in windfall profits and said there was the possibility of a strike during the tournament.

The construction of Dunedin's Forsyth Barr Stadium, known during the tournament as Otago Stadium, was a source of concern as the project was operating in a tight time frame. An April 2010 progress report stated that the project remained on target for completion prior to the Rugby World Cup, although there was a medium level of risk with some significant and potentially damaging concerns. If the project had not been completed on time, organisers would have reverted to Carisbrook as the backup option. Forsyth Barr Stadium was officially opened on 6 August 2011.

Damage caused by the 2011 Christchurch earthquake forced the relocation of a number of cup matches, including the quarter finals.

Warm-up matches
The 2011 Tri Nations Series was shortened to include only six games instead of the usual nine. It served as the primary preparation for the tournament for Australia, South Africa and New Zealand. In the northern hemisphere, a series of friendlies played in August 2011 replaced the annual tours to the southern hemisphere. North American entrants Canada beat USA in two warm-up friendlies in August 2011.

Qualifying

Twenty teams competed in the 2011 World Cup. Twelve teams qualified by finishing in the top three of their pool in the 2007 Rugby World Cup.

Twelve of the nations at this tournament had competed in every previous Rugby World Cup – Argentina, Australia, Canada, England, France, Ireland, Italy, Japan, New Zealand, Romania, Scotland, and Wales. All the other sides also had previous World Cup experience, except for Russia who appeared in a Rugby World Cup for the first time.

Qualified teams
The following 20 teams, shown with final pre-tournament rankings, qualified for the final tournament.

ARFU (1)
  (13)
CAR (2)
  (20)
  (3)
CONSUR (1)
  (9)

FIRA–AER (9)
  (5)
  (4)
  (8)
  (11)
  (17)
  (7)
  (16)
  (19)
  (6)

FORU (5)
  (2)
  (15)
  (1)
  (10)
  (12)
NACRA (2)
  (14)
  (18)

Venues
The 13 venues for the 2011 Rugby World Cup were confirmed on 12 March 2009. A number of the venues were redeveloped to increase capacity for the event. The Government considered passing a law bypassing the consent process to allow all the stadiums' redevelopment to be completed in time.

Due to damage to Stadium Christchurch and many other facilities in Christchurch caused by the earthquake on 22 February 2011, it was announced on 16 March that the matches to be played in the city would be relocated. The two quarter-finals scheduled would be moved to Auckland, while the five pool matches moved to other centres.

On 10 November 2006, the New Zealand Government announced plans for Stadium New Zealand in Auckland. The proposal was to build the new stadium seating 70,000 on the waterfront. After much public outcry, and lack of support from the Auckland Regional Council, the proposal was dropped in favour of the redevelopment of Eden Park. The redevelopment of Eden Park's Southern and South Western stands was completed during 2010.

Dunedin's new stadium, Forsyth Barr Stadium (known as Otago Stadium during the tournament), was completed in August 2011 and was used instead of Carisbrook.

with temporary seating

Draw
Seeding of teams for the 2011 World Cup was based on their respective IRB World Rankings. The top four at the 2007 Rugby World Cup (South Africa, England, Argentina, and France) were not therefore allocated top pool spots, but "the rankings are now very well established and provide us with a credible and succinct way of seeding teams for the rugby World Cup pool draw", according to Rugby World Cup Ltd (RWCL) chairman Syd Millar.

The draw was conducted in December 2008 and used the World Rankings as of 1 December 2008, after the Northern Hemisphere Autumn internationals. The teams were placed into three bands depending on their seedings at the time, with one team from each band in each of the pools. The rankings and bands were therefore: New Zealand (1), South Africa (2), Australia (3) and Argentina (4); Wales (5), England (6), France (7) and Ireland (8); Scotland (9), Fiji (10), Italy (11) and Tonga (12).

The full draw and venues for the tournament were announced on 12 March 2009.

The opening match saw the hosts, New Zealand, take on Tonga.

By coincidence, the final match and third-place playoff match were between the countries which contested the same matches at the first Rugby World Cup, which were also held in New Zealand, in 1987.

Squads

Each country was allowed a squad of 30 players for the tournament. These squads were to be submitted to the International Rugby Board by a deadline of 22 August 2011. Once the squad was submitted a player could be replaced if injured, but would not be allowed to return to the squad. There is also a stand-down period of 72 hours before the new player is allowed to take the field. Hence, a replacement player called into a squad on the eve of a game will not be permitted to play in that game.

Match officials
On 8 April 2011, the IRB named ten referees, seven assistant referees and four television match officials to handle the pool stage games. Two of the seven assistants will also be reserve referees if required.

Referees
 Wayne Barnes
 George Clancy
 Craig Joubert
 Jonathan Kaplan
 Bryce Lawrence
 Nigel Owens
 Dave Pearson
 Romain Poite
 Alain Rolland
 Steve Walsh

Reserve and assistant referees
 Jérôme Garcès
 Chris Pollock

Assistant referees
 Carlo Damasco
 Tim Hayes
 Simon McDowell
 Vinny Munro
 Stuart Terheege

Television match officials
 Giulio De Santis
 Matt Goddard
 Graham Hughes
 Shaun Veldsman

Opening ceremony
The opening ceremony for the 2011 Rugby World Cup took place at Eden Park in Auckland on 9 September 2011 at 19:30 (NZST). The ceremony featured a blend of traditional Māori and modern New Zealand culture, and began with a fleet of 26 waka entering the city harbour. It featured traditional haka and sipi tau dances in reference to the opening match between New Zealand and Tonga, and ended with a large pyrotechnics display.

Pool stage

The first round, or pool stage, saw the twenty teams divided into four pools of five teams using the same format that was used in 2003 and in 2007. Each pool was a round-robin of ten games, where each team played one match against each of the other teams in the same pool. Teams were awarded four points for a win, two points for a draw and none for a defeat. A team scoring four or more tries in one match scored a bonus point, as did a team losing by seven or fewer points.

The teams finishing in the top two of each pool advanced to the quarterfinals. The top three teams of each pool have automatically qualified for the 2015 Rugby World Cup.

Tie-breaking criteria
If two or more teams were tied on match points, the following tiebreakers would have applied:

 The winner of the match between the two teams (would not apply if more than two teams were tied);
 Difference between points scored for and points scored against in all pool matches;
 Difference between tries scored for and tries scored against in all pool matches;
 Points scored in all pool matches;
 Most tries scored in all pool matches;
 Official IRB World Rankings as of 3 October 2011.

Pld = matches played, W = matches won, D = draws, L = losses, TF = tries for, PF = match points for, PA = match points against, +/− = sum total of points for/against, BP = bonus points, Pts = pool points

Pool A

Pool B

Pool C

Pool D

Knockout stage

Quarter-finals

Semi-finals

Bronze final

Final

Statistics

The tournament's top point scorer was South African Morné Steyn, who scored 62 points. Chris Ashton and Vincent Clerc scored the most tries, six in total.

Players of the tournament
Following the completion of the Rugby World Cup, the IRB's Rugby News Service listed the Top 5 players of the 2011 Rugby World Cup. These players were:
 Israel Dagg
 Jerome Kaino
 Jamie Roberts
 Seán O'Brien
 Jacques Burger

Broadcasting
Sky Network Television, New Zealand's largest subscription television provider, was host broadcaster for the Rugby World Cup, transmitting all matches live and in high-definition coverage. Games were also available on free-to-air networks in New Zealand, but not all pool matches were screened live on free-to-air. Broadcasting rights were allocated throughout the world by the IRB, including highlights, free-to-air and pay-per-view.

References
General

IRB announce Rugby World Cup match officials

Specific

External links

2011 RWC official website (Archived)

 
2011 in New Zealand rugby union
2011 rugby union tournaments for national teams
2011
International rugby union competitions hosted by New Zealand
September 2011 sports events in New Zealand
October 2011 sports events in New Zealand